Su Po-ya (born 17 September 1998) is a Taiwanese taekwondo practitioner. She represented Chinese Taipei at the 2018 Asian Games and claimed a gold medal in the women's 53kg bantamweight event.

References

External links
 

1998 births
Living people
Taiwanese female taekwondo practitioners
Taekwondo practitioners at the 2018 Asian Games
Medalists at the 2018 Asian Games
Asian Games gold medalists for Chinese Taipei
Asian Games medalists in taekwondo
Medalists at the 2019 Summer Universiade
Universiade gold medalists for Chinese Taipei
Universiade medalists in taekwondo
Taekwondo practitioners at the 2020 Summer Olympics
Olympic taekwondo practitioners of Taiwan
21st-century Taiwanese women